Asian Open may refer to:

Men's golf's BMW Asian Open
A former name of snooker's Thailand Masters
A former name of tennis's Thailand Open
Asian Open (tennis), a defunct WTA Tour affiliated women's tennis tournament played
Asian Open Figure Skating Trophy